Clanwilliam Dam is a concrete gravity dam on the Olifants River, near Clanwilliam, Western Cape, South Africa. The main purpose of the dam is to provide irrigation water to the agricultural region downstream.

The feasibility of raising the dam wall by another 15 metres has been investigated.

In 2015 an infrastructure development company has been appointed to do the supervision and contracts management of the project to raise the dam level. As of August 2015 the dam is planned to be raised by 13 meters, increasing its capacity by 70 million cubic metres of water.

See also
List of reservoirs and dams in South Africa
List of rivers of South Africa

References 

Dams in South Africa
Dams completed in 1935